Peter York (born 1944) is a British management consultant, author and broadcaster.

Peter York may also refer to:

Peter York (MP) (1542–1589), MP for Ripon
Pete York (born 1942), musician 
Peter York (actor) from Paxton Whitehead
Peter York (producer) from 40th Annual Grammy Awards

See also
Peter Yorke (1864–1925), Irish priest and activist
Peter York Solmssen (born 1955), American lawyer and businessman
York (surname)